Phonovision is a proof of concept format and experiment for recording a mechanical television signal on gramophone records. The format was developed in the late 1920s in London by Scottish television pioneer John Logie Baird.  The objective was not simply to record video, but to record it synchronously, as Baird intended playback from an inexpensive playback device, which he called a "Phonovisor".

Technical information
The process involved mechanically linking the television scanning mechanism, a Nipkow disk, and the record-mastering turntable. The video signal from the Nipkow disc scanner was amplified and connected to the cutting stylus of the turntable.  Baird had to make a number of compromises to get the process to work, among them using a picture rate of only five frames per second.  Unlike Baird's other experiments (including stereoscopy, colour and infra-red night-vision), there is no evidence of a public demonstration of playback of pictures.  The results were considered a failure at the time, and Baird moved on leaving behind several discs in the hands of museums and favoured company members.  

Despite its technical problems, Phonovision remains the very earliest means ever invented of recording a television signal.  In a sense, it can be seen as the progenitor of other disc-based systems, such as the European TelDec system of the early 1970s and RCA's Capacitance Electronic Disc, known as SelectaVision.

History 
The earliest surviving Phonovision disc depicts one of the "Stooky Bill" dummy heads which Baird employed for tests, and was recorded on 10 September 1927. The earliest recording of a human face is of Wally Fowlkes, and was made on 10 January 1928. On 28 March 1928, a recording of "Miss Pounsford" was made which is, in many ways, the best of the experimental discs. In the 1990s, her relatives identified Mabel Pounsford as the early TV star.

From 1982, Scottish image processing expert Donald F. McLean developed software to capture and restore the video recorded on the Phonovision discs.  Analysis of the recordings by McLean revealed that serious problems had occurred during the making of the recordings, due mostly to the mechanical linkage that was necessary to allow simple playback. The problems were largely corrected by software, and the resultant images project a far better quality image than what would have been seen in Baird's laboratories at the time.

Baird's tests are not the only such recordings which have survived. In April 1933, an early television enthusiast used a Silvatone home recording outfit, which indented a signal-modulated groove into a bare aluminium disc and was intended for recording sound, to capture the video signal from an actual BBC 30-line 12.5 frames per second live broadcast. The known surviving disc preserves about four minutes of video without the corresponding audio. It has been digitally restored and reveals a high level of production values which belies the conventional wisdom that all mechanical television programming was very simple and static and offered little entertainment value.

References

External links
 World's Earliest Television Recordings - Restored!

Television technology